Przewóz may refer to:
Przewóz, Kuyavian-Pomeranian Voivodeship (north-central Poland)
Przewóz, Żary County, a village in Lubusz Voivodeship (west Poland)
Przewóz, Zielona Góra County in Lubusz Voivodeship (west Poland)
Przewóz, Garwolin County in Masovian Voivodeship (east-central Poland)
Przewóz, Kozienice County in Masovian Voivodeship (east-central Poland)
Przewóz, Ostrów Mazowiecka County in Masovian Voivodeship (east-central Poland)
Przewóz, Opole Voivodeship (south-west Poland)
Przewóz, Kartuzy County in Pomeranian Voivodeship (north Poland)
Przewóz, part of the Podgórze district of Kraków